The 1937 Tasmanian state election was held on 20 February 1937.

Retiring Members

Nationalist
Sir John Evans MHA (Franklin)
Claude James MHA (Bass)

House of Assembly
Sitting members are shown in bold text. Tickets that elected at least one MHA are highlighted in the relevant colour. Successful candidates are indicated by an asterisk (*).

Bass
Six seats were up for election. The Labor Party was defending three seats. The Nationalist Party was defending three seats.

Darwin
Six seats were up for election. The Labor Party was defending three seats. The Nationalist Party was defending three seats.

Denison
Six seats were up for election. The Labor Party was defending three seats. The Nationalist Party was defending two seats. Independent MHA George Carruthers was defending one seat.

Franklin
Six seats were up for election. The Labor Party was defending three seats. The Nationalist Party was defending two seats, although independent MHA Benjamin Pearsall had joined the Nationalists and was running on their ticket.

Wilmot
Six seats were up for election. The Labor Party was defending two seats, although independent MHA George Becker had joined the Labor Party and was running on their ticket. The Nationalist Party was defending three seats.

See also
 Members of the Tasmanian House of Assembly, 1934–1937
 Members of the Tasmanian House of Assembly, 1937–1941

References
Tasmanian Parliamentary Library

Candidates for Tasmanian state elections